Hipodrom is a residential district located in the southern part of Sibiu, Romania. It is one of the most densely populated districts of the city, housing one third of the population. The district is separated into four smaller districts (Hipodrom I, II, III and IV) although in official records it is considered as a whole.

The name comes from the former hippodrome that was located in the region which was demolished by the Nicolae Ceaușescu regime to make space for apartment buildings.

Districts of Sibiu